The furrowed wood turtle (Rhinoclemmys areolata) is a species of turtle belonging to the genus Rhinoclemmys of the family Geoemydidae found in the Yucatán Peninsula and adjacent regions of Central America.

References

Bibliography
 
 

Rhinoclemmys
Reptiles of Belize
Reptiles of Guatemala
Reptiles of Honduras
Reptiles of Mexico
Reptiles described in 1860